You Can Say That Again is a thriller novel  by British author James Hadley Chase. It is a crime thriller revolving around the life of a small-time actor in Los Angeles.

Plot summary
Jerry Stevens is  a small-time actor who has done many part-time roles in Hollywood and is now unemployed, looking for a simple job, far less a big break. He is one day called by his job agent who tells him that he is wanted for a very special assignment in California for which he will be paid well. Jerry walks into it, which actually leads him into a world of treachery, lies and deception involving criminals. The rest of the story is about whether or not Jerry is able to deal with everyone and survive the muddle.

References
http://www.angelfire.com/celeb2/hadleychase/say_again.htm
http://www.goodreads.com/book/show/521158.You_Can_Say_That_Again
http://jameshadleychase.free.fr/summary.htm

British thriller novels
1980 British novels
Novels by James Hadley Chase
Robert Hale books